Colonel John Quincy  (July 21, 1689 – July 13, 1767) was an American soldier, politician and member of the Quincy political family. His granddaughter Abigail Adams named her son, the future president John Quincy Adams, after him. Two days after his great-grandson's birth, Quincy died. The city of Quincy, Massachusetts, is named after him.

Early life
John Quincy was born in Boston to Daniel Quincy (1651–1690) and Anna Shepard (1663–1708). Shortly after his birth, the family moved to Braintree, Massachusetts, and established a homestead at Mount Wollaston, or Merry Mount, in what is present-day Quincy.  Daniel died when John was one year old; his mother subsequently married the Reverend Moses Fiske. Quincy attended Harvard College, graduating in 1708.

John Quincy's paternal grandparents were Edmund Quincy II (1628-1698) and his first wife, Joanna Hoare Quincy.  Edmund Quincy II built the Dorothy Quincy House (1685). His paternal great grandfather's father was Edmund Quincy (1602-1636), known as "the Puritan", was an early settler of the Massachusetts Bay Colony.

On the origins of his name, John Quincy Adams writes the Rev. George W. Blagden, 

Quincy inherited Mt. Wollaston, an estate purchased by his great-grandfather, Captain William Tyng, one of Boston's wealthiest merchants, who had acquired the property and other lands from William Coddington (1601–1678), who was in exile.

Career
In 1717, he was elected to represent Braintree at the Massachusetts General Court, was re-elected in 1719, and served in that capacity until 1740.  From 1729 to 1741, he served as the Speaker of the House.  In 1741, Quincy was voted out of office, but was returned there in 1744, where he served four additional years.

Personal life

On September 3, 1715, he married Elizabeth Norton (1696–1769), daughter of the Reverend John Norton (divine) of Hingham. Although officially only achieving the rank of major in the colonial militia, he was commonly referred to as "Colonel". Together they had four children:
Norton Quincy (1716–1801), who married Martha Salisbury (1727–1748)
Anna Quincy (1719–1799), married John Thaxter (1721–1802)
Elizabeth Quincy (1721–1775), who married William Smith (1707-1783).
Lucy Quincy (1729–1785), married Cotton Tufts (1732–1815)

He died on 13 July 1767 at the age of 77, only two days after the birth of his namesake, John Quincy Adams, and one month before the duty on tea had been imposed by Act of Parliament of June 14, 1767. He also died a week before his 78th birthday.

Descendants
The Colonel was Elizabeth Quincy Smith's father and grandfather of Abigail Smith Adams (1744–1818).  Abigail Smith Adams was first Second Lady of the United States and second First Lady of the United States being married to John Adams. John Quincy Adams (1767–1848), her son, was 6th President of the United States, serving from 1825 to 1829. He also served as a diplomat, a Senator and member of the United States House of Representatives.

Honors
The city of Quincy, Massachusetts, is named after him.

References
Notes

Sources
Wilson, Daniel Munro, and Charles Francis Adams. John Quincy, Master of Mount Wollaston. Boston: George H. Ellis Company, 1909.

1689 births
1767 deaths
American slave owners
British America army officers
Harvard College alumni
Members of the colonial Massachusetts House of Representatives
People from Braintree, Massachusetts
People from colonial Boston
Quincy family